is a 1958 black-and-white Japanese film directed by Nobuo Nakagawa.

There are two parts of the film: the first part  and the second part . Both parts have the same staff and the same actors.

Cast 
 Kanjūrō Arashi (嵐寛寿郎)
 Misako Uji (宇治 みさ子)
 Ryūzaburō Nakamura (中村竜三郎) - dual role
 Ureo Egawa (江川 宇礼雄)
 Tomohiko Ōtani (大谷友彦)
 Saburō Sawai (沢井三郎)
 Tetsurō Tamba (丹波哲郎)
 Masao Takamatsu (高松政雄)
 Kōtarō Bandō (坂東好太郎)
 Fumiko Miyata (宮田文子)
 Namiji Matsuura (松浦浪路)

References

External links 

 http://search.varietyjapan.com/moviedb/cinema_25941.html

Japanese black-and-white films
1958 films
Films directed by Nobuo Nakagawa
Shintoho films
1950s Japanese films